This is a list of awards and nominations received by English actor Freddie Highmore. For Finding Neverland (2004) and Charlie and the Chocolate Factory (2005), he won the Critics' Choice Movie Award for Best Young Performer in two consecutive years. For five seasons, Highmore starred as Norman Bates in the A&E drama-thriller series Bates Motel (2013–2017), for which he was thrice nominated for the Critics' Choice Television Award for Best Actor in a Drama Series. He made his screenwriting debut with the series, and in 2017 won a People's Choice Award for his performance. Also in 2017, he began starring as Dr. Shaun Murphy in the ABC drama series The Good Doctor, on which he also serves as a producer. For the role, he received his first Golden Globe Award nomination.

Major associations

Critics' Choice Movie Awards

Critics' Choice Television Awards

Golden Globe Awards

Screen Actors Guild Awards

Other awards and nominations

Capri Exploit Awards

Empire Awards

Fangoria Chainsaw Awards

HCA TV Awards

Las Vegas Film Critics' Society Awards

London Film Critics' Circle Awards

MTV Movie & TV Awards

Online Film and Television Association Awards

People's Choice Awards

Phoenix Film Critics Society Awards

Satellite Awards

Saturn Awards

Teen Choice Awards

Utah Film Critics Association Awards

Young Artist Awards

Notes

References

External links
 

Highmore, Freddie